The Literary and Historical Society (L&H) is the oldest society in University College Dublin (UCD), which according to its constitution is the 'College Debating Union'. Founded in 1855 by Cardinal John Henry Newman, as of 2017 it had over 5000 enrolled members, and has been the largest student society in UCD.

History

Foundation 
The L&H was founded in 1855, a year after the foundation of the Catholic University of Ireland, the precursor to UCD.  Both the university and the debating society were founded by Father John Henry Newman (future Cardinal Newman). One of the society's most famous members from this era was James Joyce, who presented his paper "Drama and Life" before a crowd of assembled members in 1900. Conor Cruise O'Brien served as vice president of the society during his time in UCD.

Most of the college's societies, including the UCD Student Union itself can trace their roots to the L&H.

Earlsfort years 
Before the university moved to Belfield, the debates were held on Saturday nights in the Physics Theatre, in Earlsfort Terrace. Quite often, events occurring at the society's debates made front page news in the national press. At various occasions, college authorities and external bodies attempted to shut the society down, including in 1961, when the L&H was suspended by UCD authorities. No such attempts have been successful.

On the Belfield campus 

In 1972, the society again relocated, this time to UCD's Belfield campus, where the majority of students now studied. Since this time the society has grown in size and popularity due to the novice but dangerous initiation tasks that committee members carry out.

Centennial and sesquicentennial histories

A 150th anniversary book, edited by Frank Callanan SC, was published to update James Meenan’s centenary history of the society, published in 1955. The book, together with the reprinted centenary history, details the history of the society and includes articles by personalities from the society's past, including Maeve Binchy, Owen Dudley Edwards, Vincent Browne, Kevin Myers, Adrian Hardiman and Michael McDowell.

Activities

House debates
The society gathers once a week to debate a topic of the day. This is the main activity of the society, and typically takes place on Wednesday evenings in the custom-built Garret FitzGerald Debating Chamber, in the UCD Student Centre. Personalities central to the topic being discussed are invited to enlighten the house with knowledge and arguments specific to the motion, as well as student members of the society.

Guest speakers and accolades
The L&H regularly invites speakers outside of debates. Former speakers have included actor Roger Moore, economist Paul Krugman, linguist Noam Chomsky, Irish politician John Hume, LGBTQ+ activist Rory O'Neil aka Panti Bliss, photographer and blogger Brandon Stanton of Humans of New York, writer Bill Bryson, economist John Nash and British Writer Neil Gaiman .

The society awards Honorary Fellowships and James Joyce Awards to individuals who have "contributed significantly to a field of human endeavour". Recipients of either of the two awards include F. W. de Klerk, Rev. Jesse Jackson, Noam Chomsky and Prime Minister of Australia John Howard, actor Ralph Fiennes, actor Will Ferrell, author J. K. Rowling, former UN Chief Weapons Inspector Hans Blix, novelist Bill Bryson, former England soccer captain Gary Lineker, The Beatles' producer George Martin, Monty Python member Michael Palin actor Martin Freeman, writer Salman Rushdie. and Irish author Liz Nugent.

Since the foundation of the Irish state, every President and Taoiseach has addressed the society.

L&H Strauss Ball
Each year, the society hosts UCD's only white tie ball, the Strauss Ball. After waltzes with each person on the card, the orchestra moves aside for the DJ. The society also hosts various nightclub events throughout the year. The event is run and organised by the social secretaries and strauss ball convenors.

Competitive debating
The L&H has won a number of international debating competitions and has won The Irish Times and Mace debating competitions as well as international and national intervarsities.  The society has attended the World Universities Debating Championship, and progressed further and has sent teams to events in Asia, Australia, Africa and North America. In 1987 and 2006, UCD hosted the World Universities Debating Championship.

The society also promotes and organises competitive debating in schools across Ireland through the Schools' Mace, the Leinster Schools Debating Competition (co-organised by Trinity's College Historical Society) and the UCD Junior Schools Debating Competition, which reach secondary schools throughout the country.

Organisation

Auditor and committee
The L&H is run by a committee each with specific responsibilities. The committee is chosen by the auditor, who is elected on a yearly basis by the enrolled membership of the society. The auditor is the head of the committee and responsible for the general running of the society. Each session begins in or around the beginning of the month of March, on the date of the AGM. The new auditor for the coming year is appointed at this meeting, either as the result of an election from the enrolled membership or, in cases where a single candidate is unopposed, by nomination. Notable former auditors of the society include former President of Ireland and Chief Justice Cearbhall Ó Dálaigh, comedians Dara Ó Briain and Jarlath Regan, suffragist and writer Francis Sheehy-Skeffington and Irish Supreme Court judge Adrian Hardiman. James Joyce ran for election to the post of auditor twice, and was defeated on both occasions.

The 153rd session of the society recorded record membership for any university society in Europe. The membership exceeded 5,000 members, surpassing by several hundred the previous record, also set by the L&H in its 150th session. The 159th session of the society again broke this record, making it the university's largest ever society.

President and vice presidents
The roles of president and vice president are largely ceremonial. The president of the L&H is always the president of the university. There are a number of vice-presidents, mostly made up of former members.

See also
 List of L&H auditors 1855-2018

References

External links
 Literary and Historical Society Website
 UCD Website

University College Dublin
Student debating societies in Ireland
Student organizations established in 1855
1855 establishments in Ireland